UniWar is a video game for mobile devices, initially released in April 2009 for Android and iOS and then released to other platforms such as Ovi (Nokia) and BlackBerry App World. It is a turn-based strategy game with multiplayer online gameplay as well as a single-player campaign mode.

Gameplay
Uniwar is a turn-based strategy game with multiplayer online gameplay for up to eight players as well as a single-player campaign mode. The game takes place on a hexagonal map, where each player moves their units. Each side's goal is to capture all of their opponents' bases. For each base a player controls, he earns additional credits which can be spent constructing units such as tanks and helicopters. The game consists of twenty-one single-player levels and three armies: Sapians (humans), Titans (machines), and Khralians (aliens). Each army, or race, includes 8 basic  and 3 unlockable unit types, and each unit type has different degrees of mobility, attack strength, and defense.

Uniwar allows players to participate in several games at once. Thus, when the player is waiting for his opponent(s) to make their moves in one game, he is free to take his turn in another. Team play allows 2v2, 3v3, and 4v4 gameplay. Players can maintain lists of friends and can access a list of scores showing the ranking of all players. When the player joins a random game, he is matched to another player. Upon the completion of a rated battle, points are awarded to the winner and deducted from the loser, the rank of the players affects the points lost or won.

Development

Development for Uniwar started in earnest in Summer 2008 and completed in April 2009. Though released on the iPhone, the title was originally conceived for Java mobile devices.

References

External links
Official UniWar web site
UniWar HD - Trailer

Russian UniWar base
UniWar Poland
UniWar Poland YouTube videos

2009 video games
Mobile games
IOS games
Video games developed in the United States
Android (operating system) games
BlackBerry games
Turn-based strategy video games